Arden may refer to:

Places
Australia
Arden, an area in North Melbourne, Victoria near the Arden Street Oval

Canada
Arden, Ontario

Denmark
Arden, Denmark, a town
Arden Municipality, a former municipality, including the town of Arden

United Kingdom
Arden, Warwickshire (formerly called the Forest of Arden)
Arden, Argyll and Bute
Arden, Glasgow

United States
 Arden-Arcade, California
 Arden, North Sacramento, California
 Arden, Delaware
 Arden, Indianapolis, a suburb of Indianapolis, Indiana
 Arden on the Severn, Maryland
 Arden (Andover, Massachusetts)
 Arden Hills, Minnesota
 Arden, Missouri
 Arden, Nevada
 Arden, New York
 Arden Valley Road, located in Southfields, New York
 Arden, North Carolina
 Arden, Texas
 Arden, Washington
 Arden, Barbour County, West Virginia
 Arden, Berkeley County, West Virginia
 Arden (estate), a National Historic Landmark in New York

People
 Arden (name), a surname and given name, including a list of people with the surname

Schools
 Arden University, a private university located in the United Kingdom, a distance and blended learning university,
 Arden Academy in Knowle, UK
 Arden Anglican School, Australia
 Arden School of Theatre in Manchester, UK

Organizations
 Arden International, a multiple formula racing team created and run by Garry Horner
 Arden Theatre Company (Philadelphia), a full-service professional regional theatre in Philadelphia
 Arden Theatre Company (Stockton-on-Tees), a regional theatre company located in Stockton-on-Tees, England

Entertainment
 Arden of Faversham, a 16th-century English play
 Enoch Arden, poem by Alfred Lord Tennyson
 Arden: The World of Shakespeare, a short-lived research and teaching MMO game
 Arden Shakespeare, a series of scholarly editions of the works of William Shakespeare

Products
 Arden (automobile), an English car
 Tannoy Arden, a model of loudspeaker system by Tannoy Ltd.

Other uses
 Arden syntax

See also 
 Ardennes, a region in Belgium, Luxembourg and France
 Ardennes (disambiguation)
 Jane Arden (disambiguation)